Jerry Preston Anderson (September 30, 1951 – October 15, 1980) was an American football cornerback who played one season for the Cleveland Browns in 1974. He was drafted in the 16th round (407) in the 1974 NFL Draft. He was also drafted in the 27th round (314) in the 1974 WFL Draft.

References

External links

Living people
Cleveland Browns players
Players of American football from Texas
1951 births
American football cornerbacks
Rice Owls football players
People from Bonham, Texas